KMOD-FM (97.5 MHz) is a mainstream rock radio station in Tulsa, Oklahoma, owned by iHeartMedia, Inc.  The station plays a wide variety of rock music from the 1960s through today.  Its studios are located at the Tulsa Event Center in Southeast Tulsa and its transmitter site is on the Osage Reservation.

KMOD-FM broadcasts in the HD digital format.

History
KOCW signed on September 30, 1959. It was owned by Grayhill, Inc.; in 1960, Claude Hill bought out partner Meridith Gray. KOCW was sold to Dawson Communications/Turnpike Broadcasting Corporation in 1968 and became KMOD on April 15 of that year. Clear Channel acquired the station in 1973 out of bankruptcy.

The station is best known as the nearly 30-year home of disc jockeys Brent Douglas and Phil Stone, who originated the character Roy D. Mercer, the notorious and popular prank caller who regularly threatened to "open a can of whup-ass" on the person he called (for some fabricated wrong the person supposedly had done), only for the person to find out the call was a prank.  Stone died in 2012, not long after he and Douglas were not allowed to continue their works as DJs due to the latter's refusal to sign a new contract.

Actress Jeanne Tripplehorn was also a DJ at KMOD in the 1980s; she was known as Jeanne Summers.

On January 18, 2021, nationally syndicated John Clay Wolfe Show joined KMOD on Saturday mornings.

External links
KMOD official website

References

MOD-FM
Mainstream rock radio stations in the United States
IHeartMedia radio stations
1959 establishments in Oklahoma